Bushma is a rural locality (a settlement) in Biryukovsky Selsoviet, Privolzhsky District, Astrakhan Oblast, Russia. The population was 262 as of 2010. There are 3 streets.

Geography 
Bushma is located 21 km east of Nachalovo (the district's administrative centre) by road. Ivanovsky is the nearest rural locality.

References 

Rural localities in Privolzhsky District, Astrakhan Oblast